David Aleksandrovich Gamrekeli (27 July 1911 – 29 November 1977) was a Georgian baritone opera singer.

Biography
Gamrekeli was born in Chiatura, Western Georgia. In 1935, he graduated from the Tbilisi State Conservatory, studying under Professor Vronsky. That year, the young baritone sang at the Tbilisi Opera and Ballet Theatre the role of Prince Yeletsky from Tchaikovsky's opera The Queen of Spades. In 1937 in Moscow, Georgian Literature and the Arts of the decade, he performed Kiazo's role in Paliashvili's opera Daisi (Sunset). One year later he became laureate of the First All-Union Competition of Vocalists.

He sang the leading roles from Georgian and foreign operas at the Tbilisi Opera and Ballet Theatre. In 1943, he was awarded the title People's Artist. Gamrekeli performed as a soloist at the Bolshoi Theatre from 1944 to 1952. In 1947 he took the role of the Commissar (Sergo Ordzhonikidze) in Vano Muradeli's ill-fated opera, The Great Friendship.

Gamrekeli's opera repertoire included thirty opera roles, including Tchaikovsky's Eugene Onegin, Verdi's Rigoletto, the roles of Renato and Germont, Escamillo from Bizet's Carmen and others.

He died in Tbilisi in 1977, aged 66.

References

External links

1911 births
1977 deaths
20th-century male opera singers from Georgia (country)
People from Imereti
People from Kutais Governorate
Stalin Prize winners
Recipients of the Order of the Red Banner of Labour
Operatic baritones
Burials at Didube Pantheon
Soviet opera singers